Crest Hill is a city in Lockport Township, Will County, Illinois, United States. The 2020 census put Crest Hill's population at 20,459.

History
The neighborhood of Stern Park Gardens, later incorporated with Crest Hill, renamed itself Lidice in 1942 following the Lidice massacre. Former presidential candidate Wendell Willkie and Czechoslovak president-in-exile Edvard Beneš spoke at the dedication commemorating the tragedy.

Geography
Crest Hill is located at  (41.5645, -88.1089). Crest Hill decided to incorporate itself to avoid being annexed by the City of Joliet and became officially incorporated as the City of Crest Hill January 22, 1960.

Demographics

At the 2000 census, there were 13,329 people, 4,478 households and 2,758 families residing in the city. The racial makeup of the city was 69.4% (White Non-Hispanic) 19.6% (African American), 8.8% (Hispanic), 3.2% (Other), 1.4% (Two or more races), .5% (American Indian). Total can be more than 100% because Hispanics could be counted in other races.

There were 4,478 households, of which 30.2% had children under the age of 18 living with them, 45.1% were married couples living together, 12.0% had a female householder with no husband present, and 38.4% were non-families. 30.9% of all households were made up of individuals, and 7.9% had someone living alone who was 65 years of age or older. The average household size was 2.37 and the average family size was 3.00.

18.9% of the population were under the age of 18, 13.6% from 18 to 24, 41.2% from 25 to 44, 17.1% from 45 to 64, and 9.2% who were 65 years of age or older. The median age was 32 years. For every 100 females, there were 147.7 males. For every 100 females age 18 and over, there were 157.8 males.

The median household income was $45,313 and the median family income was $54,709. Males had a median income of $41,715 compared with $27,667 for females. The per capita income for the city was $22,317. About 2.6% of families and 4.8% of the population were below the poverty line, including 4.8% of those under age 18 and 5.8% of those age 65 or over.

A significant portion of the population resides at Stateville Correctional Center (see below). The 2010 U.S. Census Bureau data states that 3,160 residents of Crest Hill (15.2% of the population) are institutionalized.

Government and infrastructure

The Stateville Correctional Center of the Illinois Department of Corrections is located in Crest Hill. John Wayne Gacy was executed by lethal injection at Stateville Correctional Center in 1994.

Schools
Elementary school districts include:
 Chaney-Monge School District 88
 Richland School District 88A

Private schools include:
 Joliet Montessori School

Most of Crest Hill is zoned to Lockport Township High School.

Notable people
 Ron Coomer, Major League Baseball player and broadcaster, born in Crest Hill

References

External links

 

 
Cities in Illinois
Cities in Will County, Illinois
Populated places established in 1960
1960 establishments in Illinois